Radivoje Golubović (born 22 April 1990) is a Montenegro football right back who most recently played for Kom Podgorica.

Club statistics
Total matches played in Moldavian First League: 13 matches - 4 goals and 1 goal from Moldovan Cup

References

External links

1990 births
Living people
Footballers from Podgorica
Association football fullbacks
Montenegrin footballers
FK Budućnost Podgorica players
FK Mogren players
FC Dacia Chișinău players
OFK Titograd players
FK Iskra Danilovgrad players
FK Dečić players
FK Kom players
Montenegrin First League players
Moldovan Super Liga players
Montenegrin expatriate footballers
Expatriate footballers in Moldova
Montenegrin expatriate sportspeople in Moldova